"Little Boy" is a 1963 song by the Crystals written by Greenwich and Barry and produced by Phil Spector. The song reached #92 on the US chart.

In its contemporary review, Cash Box said that "the overwhelming 'Phil Spector-instrumental sound' is much in evidence as the gals devote this one to their 'crush.'"

References

1963 singles
1963 songs
Songs written by Ellie Greenwich
Songs written by Jeff Barry
The Crystals songs
Song recordings produced by Phil Spector